Steven Edward Sewell (born April 2, 1963), is a former professional American football player who was selected by the Denver Broncos in the 1st round of the 1985 NFL Draft. A 6'3", 210-lb. running back from the University of Oklahoma, Sewell played his entire NFL career for the Broncos from 1985 to 1991, making Super Bowl appearances in Super Bowl XXI, Super Bowl XXII and Super Bowl XXIV.  Sewell finished his seven seasons with 917 rushing yards, 187 receptions for 2,354 yards, and 26 total touchdowns. Sewell is now the head football coach at Overland High School in Aurora, Colorado. 

In 1988 Sewell had his first son and in 1999 Sewell had fraternal twins. He and his family live in Centennial, Colorado.

High school years
Sewell attended Riordan High School in San Francisco, California and was a student and a letterman in football.
Steve played three years of Varsity Football at Archbishop Riordan High School under Coach Dan Hayes, where he gained 1723 yards rushing in his career.  In his senior year, he gained 1041 yards rushing and scored 10 TDs rushing as he led Riordan to an 8 win and 2 loss season.

College years
Sewell played in 47 games in his four years with the Oklahoma Sooners rushing for 1178 yards and 10 touchdowns on 187 carries (6.3 avg) and also had 560 yards receiving and 4 touchdowns on 33 receptions (17.0 avg). During his senior season Sewell had 295 all-purpose yards in a 24-6 victory over conference opponent Kansas State; at the time it was the third highest single game total by a Sooner.

References

1963 births
Living people
Players of American football from San Francisco
American football running backs
Oklahoma Sooners football players
Denver Broncos players